The Stevens–Bruxner ministry (1932–1935) or First Stevens–Bruxner ministry or First Stevens ministry was the 46th ministry of the New South Wales Government, and was led by the 25th Premier, Bertram Stevens, in a United Australia Party coalition with the Country Party, that was led by Lieutenant-Colonel Michael Bruxner, DSO. The ministry was one of three occasions when the Government was led by Stevens, as Premier; and one of four occasions where Bruxner served as Deputy Premier.

Stevens was first elected to the New South Wales Legislative Assembly in 1927 and served continuously until 1940. Having served as a senior minister in the Bavin ministry, following the defeat of the Nationalist coalition led by Bavin, who was in poor health, at the 1930 state election, Stevens was elected leader of the newly formed United Australia Party in New South Wales and became Leader of the Opposition. Bruxner was first elected to the Assembly in 1920 and served continuously until 1962. Initially a member of the Progressive Party, he served as party leader in opposition between 1922 and 1925; and resumed leadership in 1932, following the resignation of his successor, Ernest Buttenshaw. By this stage, the party was renamed as the Country Party.

This ministry covers the period from 13 May 1932 when, as a result of the Lang Dismissal Crisis, the Governor of New South Wales, Philip Game used the reserve power of The Crown to remove Jack Lang as Premier. The ministry served until 10 February 1935 when the 1935 state election saw the Stevens–Bruxner coalition re-elected for a subsequent term.

Composition of ministry

In the first arrangement, lasting just two days, Stevens was the only Member of Government pending formation of the full ministry as a result of the turmoil following the dismissal of Lang and his third ministry. The composition of the ministry was announced by Premier Stevens on 16 May 1932 and covers a period of a little over one month as an "emergency ministry" up until 17 June 1932 when the outcome of the 1932 state election was determined. At that point, a minor reshuffle of the ministry was effected.

 
Ministers are members of the Legislative Assembly unless otherwise noted.

See also

Second Stevens–Bruxner ministry
Third Stevens–Bruxner ministry
Members of the New South Wales Legislative Assembly, 1932-1935
Members of the New South Wales Legislative Council, 1932-1934
Members of the New South Wales Legislative Council, 1934-1937

References

 

! colspan="3" style="border-top: 5px solid #cccccc" | New South Wales government ministries

New South Wales ministries
1932 establishments in Australia
1935 disestablishments in Australia